Anne de Batarnay de Joyeuse, Baron d'Arques, Vicomte then Duke of Joyeuse (1560 – 20 October 1587) was a royal favourite and active participant in the French Wars of Religion.

An intimate friend of Henry III of France, he was keeper of the king's chambers. With these serious responsibilities he also gained a number of privileges around the court, including the wearing of royal colors, such as royal blue, purple, and red. He also had the right to wear jewelry of high majesties of the court, such as a well-known red ruby and diamond ring given to him by the king: it had been confiscated from Princesse Marguerite de Valois as punishment for having accused Anne of trying to interfere with a meeting with the king, as requested of her by Catherine de' Medici. Anne was also a member of the circle of young courtiers known as Les Mignons.

Life
Anne was born in 1560 in the château de Joyeuse. He was the eldest son of Guillaume, 8th Vicomte de Joyeuse, the owner of the rights to the Bishopric of Alet and Marshal of France in 1575. Cardinal François de Joyeuse was his younger brother. He was reared in Toulouse and attended the Collège de Navarre, starting in August 1572.

As a mignon of Henry III of France, Anne was made gentleman of the chamber in 1577 and by 1579 he was Chamberlain. During this time, Anne accompanied his father in the annual expeditions against the Huguenots in Languedoc and Auvergne. In 1579, he was put in charge of a compagnie d'ordonnance and was soon appointed governor of Mont Saint-Michel. In 1580, he took part in the siege of Fère-en-Tardenois.

The King arranged Joyeuse's marriage to his sister-in-law, Marguerite, daughter of Nicholas, Duke of Mercœur. The nuptials were celebrated on 18 September 1581 with unprecedented magnificence. King Henry used the marriage as a pretext for elevating his favourite to the dignity of Duc de Joyeuse. He was given precedence over all other dukes and peers of France, with the exception of princes of the blood. In addition to more than 300,000 écus in dowry, he was given the seigneury of Limours.

In 1582, Anne was made Grand-admiral de France (1 June) and commander in the Order of the Holy Spirit, the kingdom's highest chivalric order (31 December). He was appointed governor of Normandy in 1583 and Le Havre in 1584. After the death of Duke François the Joyeuse brothers were allowed to govern the duchies of Anjou and Alençon in the name of the king.

At the onset of the War of the Three Henrys, Anne, appointed by Henry III, led royal troops against the king's arch-enemy, Henry of Navarre in Poitou. He suffered a defeat at the hands of the Huguenots at the Battle of Coutras and while trying to surrender was killed, as was his 18-year-old brother Charles, lord of Saint-Sauveur. He was childless and was succeeded as Duke of Joyeuse by another brother, François.

Notes

References

Sources

Further reading
Pierre de Vaissière, Messieurs de Joyeuse (1560-1615), Paris, Albin Michel, 1926. 352 p.
François Puaux, Histoire de la Réformation française, tome II, Paris, Lévy, 1859.

1560s births
1587 deaths
People from Ardèche
University of Paris alumni
French people of the French Wars of Religion
French military personnel killed in action
Admirals of France
Anne